In algebra, a monic polynomial is a non-zero univariate polynomial (that is, a polynomial in a single variable) in which the leading coefficient (the nonzero coefficient of highest degree) is equal to 1. That is to say, a monic polynomial is one that can be written as

with

Uses 

Monic polynomials are widely used in algebra and number theory, since they produce many simplifications and they avoid divisions and denominators. Here are some examples.

Every polynomial is associated to a unique monic polynomial. In particular, the unique factorization property of polynomials can be stated as: Every polynomial can be uniquely factorized as the product of its leading coefficient and a product of monic irreducible polynomials.

Vieta's formulas are simpler in the case of monic polynomials: The th elementary symmetric function of the roots of a monic polynomial of degree  equals  where  is the coefficient of the th power of the indeterminate.

Euclidean division of a polynomial by a monic polynomial does not introduce divisions of coefficients. Therefore, it is defined for polynomials with coefficients in a commutative ring.

Algebraic integers are defined as the roots of monic polynomials with integer coefficients.

Properties 
Every nonzero univariate polynomial (polynomial with a single indeterminate) can be written  

where  are the coefficients of the polynomial, and the leading coefficient  is not zero. By definition, such a polynomial is monic if 

A product of polynomials is monic if and only if all factors are monic.

The "if" condition implies that, the monic polynomials in a univariate polynomial ring over a commutative ring form a monoid under polynomial multiplication.

Two monic polynomials are associated if and only they are equal, since the multiplication of a polynomial by a nonzero constant produces a polynomial with this constant as its leading coefficient.

Divisibility induces a partial order on monic polynomials. This results almost immediately from the preceding properties.

Polynomial equations

Let  be a polynomial equation, where  is a univariate polynomial of degree .

For example, the equation

is equivalent to the monic equation

On the other hand, as shown by the previous example, when the coefficients are explicit integers, the associated monic polynomial is generally more complicated. Therefore, primitive polynomials are often used instead of monic polynomials when dealing with integer coefficients.

Integral elements
Monic polynomial equations are at the basis of the theory of algebraic integers, and, more generally of integral elements.

Let  be a subring of a field ; this implies that  is an integral domain.

A complex number that is integral over the integers is called an algebraic integer. This terminology is motivated by the fact that the integers are exactly the rational numbers that are also algebraic integers. This results from the rational root theorem, which asserts that, if the rational number  is a root of a polynomial with integer coefficients, then  is a divisor of the leading coefficient; so, if the polynomial is monic, then  and the number is an integer. Conversely, an integer  is a root of the monic polynomial 

An integral domain that equals its integral closure in its field of fractions is called an integrally closed domain.

These concepts are fundamental in algebraic number theory. For example, many of the numerous wrong proofs of the Fermat's Last Theorem that have been written during more than three centuries were wrong because the authors supposed wrongly that the algebraic integers in an algebraic number field have unique factorization.

Multivariate polynomials 
Ordinarily, the term monic is not employed for polynomials of several variables.  However, a polynomial in several variables may be regarded as a polynomial in one variable with coefficients being polynomials in the other variables. Being monic depends thus on the choice of one "main" variable. For example, the polynomial

In the context of Gröbner bases, a monomial order is generally fixed. In this case, a polynomial may be said to be monic, if it has 1 as its leading coefficient (for the monomial order).

For every definition, a product of polynomials is monic if and only if all factors are monic, and every polynomial is associated to exactly one monic polynomial.

Citations

References 

 

Polynomials